Antanas Vinkus (born 25 December 1942 in Kretinga) is a Lithuanian diplomat.

He was an ambassador of Lithuania to Russia (2009-2011), presenting his credentials to Russian President Dmitry Medvedev on 27 February 2009.

In 2011, Vinkus was elected mayor of Neringa.

References

1942 births
Living people
People from Kretinga
Health ministers of Lithuania
Ambassadors of Lithuania to Russia
Mayors of places in Lithuania
Neringa Municipality
Recipients of the Order of the Cross of Terra Mariana, 1st Class
21st-century Lithuanian politicians
Recipients of the Order of the White Star, 2nd Class